Steady Ground was an American alternative rock group best known for having former The Offspring drummer Ron Welty in its lineup.

On February 26, 2006, Steady Ground released three demos on Myspace, entitled "Everyone's Emotional", "I Can't Contain Myself", and "You Better Close Your Eyes." In 2007, the band released the studio album Jettison, and in the same year they broke up.

Members
Ron Welty – drums (2003–2007)
George Squiers – guitars (2003–2007)
Aaron Pointon – vocals (2003–2004)
Kyle Rogan – bass (2003–2007)
Jared Woods – guitars (2003–2007)
Josh Anders – vocals (2004–2006)
Rick Stitch – vocals (2006–2007)
Benjamin Hatch – vocals (2007)

Discography

Studio albums

References

External links

Alternative rock groups from California
Culture of Santa Ana, California
Musical groups established in 2001
Musical groups disestablished in 2007